Ward 2 Etobicoke Centre is a municipal electoral division in Etobicoke, Toronto, Ontario that has been represented in the Toronto City Council since the 2018 municipal election. It was last contested in 2022, with Stephen Holyday being elected councillor.

History 
The ward was created in 2018 when the provincial government aligned Toronto's then-44 municipal wards with the 25 corresponding provincial and federal ridings. The current ward is an amalgamation of the old Ward 3 (western section), the old Ward 4 (eastern section).

2018 municipal election 
Ward 2 was first contested during the 2018 municipal election. Then-Ward 3 incumbent Stephen Holyday was elected with 38.58 per cent of the vote.

2022 municipal election 
Stephen Holyday was comfortably re-elected in 2022 with 72.28 per cent of the vote.

Geography 
Etobicoke Centre is part of the Etobicoke and York community council. 

The ward's west boundary is the municipal border with the Region of Peel, and the east boundary is the Humber River. The north boundary is roughly along Eglinton Avenue, Martin Grove Road and Dixon Road, and the south boundary is roughly along the Mimico Creek, Dundas Street, Kipling Avenue, Bloor Street and Highway 427.

Councillors

Election results

See also 

 Municipal elections in Canada
 Municipal government of Toronto
 List of Toronto municipal elections

References

External links 

 Councillor's webpage

Etobicoke
Toronto city council wards
2018 establishments in Ontario